Midway Contemporary Art is a non-profit arts organization located in Minneapolis, Minnesota. Its gallery and research library are located in the Sheridan and Marcy Homes neighborhoods of the city, respectively. Both are free and open to the public.

History
Midway Contemporary Art was founded in January 2001 by John Ballinger and John Rasmussen. Part of its mission is to promote emerging and underrepresented artists. Rasmussen is the current Executive Director.

Originally located in Saint Paul's Midway neighborhood, the gallery moved to the Marcy Homes neighborhood in January 2006. Midway Contemporary started the Midway Contemporary Art Library in 2007. The gallery hosts five exhibitions during the year in addition to film screenings and lectures.

Midway Contemporary Art is funded through public and private foundations, individuals, and governmental support. The organization also hosts two annual fundraiser events. During the annual Monster Drawing Rally fundraiser, dozens of local artists gather to produce drawings which are sold upon completion.

Curator Chris Sharp of Mexico City-based project space Lulu named Midway Contemporary among his inspirations, citing its consistent quality and contributions to the local and international scenes.

Selected exhibitions
Nick Mauss: Perforations, September 16 - November 5, 2011
Its chiming in Normaltown, Sue Tompkins, September 7-October 20, 2012
Exploring Compositional Epistemologies, January 16 - February 14, 2015
Can’t Reach Me There, July 30 – October 3, 2015

Lectures

References

External links
Official website

Art museums and galleries in Minnesota
Arts organizations based in Minneapolis
Contemporary art galleries in the United States
Tourist attractions in Minneapolis
Art galleries established in 2001
2001 establishments in Minnesota